The Forks River is a river in the James Bay and Moose River drainage basins in Cochrane and Timiskaming Districts in northeastern Ontario, Canada. It flows  from Forks Lake to its mouth at Night Hawk Lake, the source of the Frederick House River, a tributary of the Abitibi River.

Course
Portions of both lakes lie in the northeastern portion of the Unorganized, North Part of Sudbury District, meaning that the Forks River drainage basin is in three Ontario districts. It heads northeast, then north, flows over a small dam, and takes in the left tributary Little Forks Creek arriving from Little Forks Lake.

Tributaries
Little Forks Creek (left)

See also
List of rivers of Ontario

References

Rivers of Cochrane District
Rivers of Sudbury District
Rivers of Timiskaming District